The Kutu are a matrilineal ethnic and linguistic group based in the Morogoro Region of central Tanzania.  In 1987, the Kutu population was estimated to number 45,000.

References

Ethnic groups in Tanzania
Indigenous peoples of East Africa